No Stranger is Canadian singer Tom Cochrane's fifth solo studio album and first album for Universal Music Canada released in October 2006. No Stranger included the hits "Didn't Mean", "The Party's Not Over", "Northern Star", "Out of My Head", and a cover version of Norman Greenbaum's "Spirit in the Sky". Red Rider bandmates Ken Greer and Jeff Jones performed on the album.

Recording took place at Metalworks Studios and Layastone. Cochrane produced the album and mixed it at his studio in Northern Ontario. No Stranger received a Juno Award nomination for Canadian Adult Alternative Album of the Year.

Track listing

References

2006 albums
Tom Cochrane albums
Universal Records albums
Albums recorded at Metalworks Studios